is a former Japanese football player. He played for Japan national team.

Club career
Kawakami was born in Saitama on October 4, 1947. After graduating from Rikkyo University, he joined Hitachi in 1971. The club won the league championship in 1972. The club also won 1972 and 1975 Emperor's Cups. He retired in 1978. He played 128 games and scored 7 goals in the league. He was selected as one of the Best Eleven in 1972 and 1975.

National team career
On July 31, 1970, when Kawakami was a Rikkyo University student, he debuted for the Japan national team against Hong Kong. He played at the 1970 and 1974 Asian Games. He was also selected by Japan for the 1974, 1978 World Cup qualification, and the 1976 Summer Olympics qualification. He played 41 games for Japan until 1977.

Club statistics

National team statistics

References

External links
 
 Japan National Football Team Database

1947 births
Living people
Rikkyo University alumni
Association football people from Saitama Prefecture
Japanese footballers
Japan international footballers
Japan Soccer League players
Kashiwa Reysol players
Footballers at the 1970 Asian Games
Footballers at the 1974 Asian Games
Association football midfielders
Asian Games competitors for Japan
Association football defenders